Q79 may refer to:
 Q79 (New York City bus)
 Al-Nazi'at, a surah of the Quran